Jana Rabasová (22 July 1933 – 3 January 2008) was a Czech gymnast who competed in the 1952 Summer Olympics. She died on 3 January 2008, at the age of 74.

References

1933 births
2008 deaths
Czech female artistic gymnasts
Olympic gymnasts of Czechoslovakia
Gymnasts at the 1952 Summer Olympics
Olympic bronze medalists for Czechoslovakia
Olympic medalists in gymnastics
Medalists at the 1952 Summer Olympics